Helge Hansen may refer to:

 Helge Hansen (resistance fighter), a Norwegian resistance fighter during World War II.
 Helge Hansen (general), Inspector of the German Army from 1992 to 1994 and Commander AFCENT from 1994 to 1996.
 Helge Hansen (cyclist) (born 1925), Danish cyclist.